The following article presents a summary of the 2008–09 football (soccer) season in Croatia, which was the 18th season of competitive football in the country.

National team
The home team is on the left column; the away team is on the right column.

Friendly matches

World Cup qualifiers
Croatia is currently in Group 6 of the 2010 FIFA World Cup qualification process.

League tables

Prva HNL

Druga HNL

Treća HNL

Division East

Division South

Division West

Honours

Croatian clubs in Europe

Summary

Dinamo Zagreb

Slaven Belupo

Hajduk Split

Rijeka

References